Phoenicoprocta lydia, the Lydia tiger moth, is a moth in the subfamily Arctiinae. It was described by Herbert Druce in 1889. It is found in Mexico and southern Texas.

Adults have been recorded on wing in October.

References

Moths described in 1889
Euchromiina